Crash! Boom! Live! is the fourth concert film by Swedish pop music duo Roxette, released on 19 September 1996 on VHS and LaserDisc formats by Picture Music International and EMI. It contains a shortened version of the duo's 14 January 1995 concert in the Ellis Park Stadium in Johannesburg, South Africa of the Crash! Boom! Bang! Tour, which saw the band performing to over one million people during its eighty-plus concerts throughout South Africa, Europe, Australia, Asia and Latin America. According to the video's liner notes, attendance for this show was in excess of 52,000 people.

Formats and track listings
All songs written by Per Gessle, except "Listen to Your Heart", "Lies" and "Spending My Time" by Gessle and Mats Persson.
 LaserDisc (Japan TOLW-3239)
 VHS (Europe MVN-491555-3 · Japan TOVW-3239)
 "Sleeping in My Car"
 "Fireworks"
 "Almost Unreal"
 "Dangerous"
 "Crash! Boom! Bang!"
 "Listen to Your Heart"
 "The First Girl on the Moon"
 "Harleys & Indians (Riders in the Sky)"
 "Lies"
 "The Rain"
 "Run to You"
 "It Must Have Been Love"
 "Dressed for Success"
 "The Big L."
 "Spending My Time"
 "The Look"
 "Love Is All (Shine Your Light on Me)"
 "Joyride"

Credits and personnel
Credits adapted from the liner notes of Crash! Boom! Live!.

 Directed by Koos Hattingh
 Produced by Storm Productions on behalf of Roxette and South African Broadcasting Corporation
 Executive produced by Tor Nielsen and Thomas Johansson at EMA Telstar
 Concert promoted by Big Concerts
 Audio recording and mixing by Alar Suurna

Musicians
 Marie Fredriksson — vocals, electric guitar, piano
 Per Gessle — vocals, rhythm guitar, harmonica
 Per "Pelle" Alsing — drums and percussion
 Micke "Nord" Andersson — electric and lap steel guitars, mandolin, backing vocals
 Anders Herrlin — bass
 Jonas Isacsson — acoustic and electric guitars
 Clarence Öfwerman — keyboards
 Mats "M.P." Persson — drums, percussion, backing vocals

References

Roxette video albums
1996 video albums
Live video albums
1996 live albums